Giuseppe Torretto or Torretti (1661 in Pagnano – 1743 in Venice) was an Italian sculptor of statues and intaglios.

Mainly working in Venice, statues by him can be found in the churches of Santa Maria Formosa, I Gesuiti, Santa Maria di Nazareth and San Stae among others. The side walls of the Manin Chapel at Udine have stone high-reliefs by him showing scenes from the life of the Blessed Virgin Mary.   He also founded a notable studio, which was kept going after his death by his grandchildren Giuseppe Bernardi and Giovanni Ferrari, whose students included Antonio Canova.

References

1661 births
1743 deaths
17th-century Italian sculptors
Italian male sculptors
18th-century Italian sculptors
18th-century Italian male artists